Immortal Melodies (also known as Mascagni) is a 1952 Italian  musical-biographical melodrama film  directed by Giacomo Gentilomo and starring Pierre Cressoy, Carla Del Poggio and Vera Molnar. It is based on real life events of classical composer Pietro Mascagni. The film's sets were designed by the art director Alberto Boccianti.

Plot

Cast 

Pierre Cressoy as Pietro Mascagni
Carla Del Poggio as  Lina, Mascagni's wife
Vera Molnar as  Wanda Pieri
Mario Del Monaco as  Stagno
Nerio Bernardi as  De Lellis 
Enzo Biliotti as  Master Crepitone
 Mimo Billi as  Navarra 
 Giuseppe Chinnici as The Doctor
 Maurizio Di Nardo as  Rocco
Giovanni Grasso as  Domenico Mascagni 
Achille Millo as  Giuseppe
 Guido Riccioli as The Operetta Comic 
 Ciro Scafa as Major of Cerignola
 Roberto Bruni as  Giovanni Targioni-Tozzetti 
Franco Scandurra as Fumia
Gian Paolo Rosmino as  Guido Menasci 
Nino Vingelli as  Fiorello
 Laura Carli as The Midwife
Giovanni Bonos as Fantasista
 Nino Milano as Fantasista
Giuseppe Addobbati as Gentleman at Teatro dell'Opera di Roma
 Giuseppe Morelli as Master Leopoldo Mugnone
Franco Pesce

References

External links

Italian musical drama films
Films directed by Giacomo Gentilomo
Films scored by Nino Rota
Biographical films about musicians
Films about composers
Films about classical music and musicians
1950s biographical drama films
1950s musical drama films
Lux Film films
Cultural depictions of classical musicians
1950s Italian films
1952 films
1950s historical films
Italian historical films
1950s Italian-language films
Films set in the 19th century